RPM Records is the name of:
RPM Records (United Kingdom)
RPM Records (United States)